, occasionally credited as You Aku (February 7, 1937 – August 1, 2007), was a Japanese lyricist, poet, and novelist.

Early life 
Yū Aku was born as Hiroyuki Fukada (深田公之, Fukada Hiroyuki) in Awaji Island, Hyogo, Japan. His parents both originated from the town of Kawaminami in Miyazaki Prefecture, Kyūshū, Japan. His father worked as a police constable in Hyogo prefecture. His father's career necessitated moving every few years, resulting in Aku attending three separate junior high schools. Yū Aku graduated from Meiji University.

Career 
Originally, Yū Aku desired to screenwrite  for movies, specifically the up-and-coming Moonlight Mask series. Aku started his career in advertisement production, which provided the foundation for his work as a lyricist. Aku worked on commercial production from 1959 to 1966. In 1964, he also took up broadcast writing. After his 1966 retirement from advertising, he continued to work as a broadcast writer and also as a lyricist. His first published work as a lyricist was the 1965 song 'Monkey Dance.' 
  
Yū Aku was famous for contributing lyrics to many recording artists since 1967. He was a prolific lyricist, writing more than 5,000 songs. Mainly during the 1970s, more than 20 of them reached #1 on the Japanese Oricon chart, and seven singles sold more than a million copies. Over 500 of his compositions which were released as singles have entered the Japanese record chart, and they sold in excess of 68 million copies from 1968 to 2007, making him the most commercially successful Japanese lyricist up to that point. As of 2015, total sales of the singles he has written exceed 68.3 million copies, making him the second best-selling lyricist in Japan behind only Yasushi Akimoto. In 1977, he wrote the lyrics to The TV Asahi Song for the occasion of the television channel’s name change to its current name.

Throughout his 40-year career as a lyricist, Aku won the Japan Record Award five times. He was also acclaimed as a novelist, and produced several award-winning works. In 1999, Aku received the Purple Ribboned Medal of Honor from the Government of Japan, in honor of his long-term contributions to the Japanese entertainment industry.

On September 12, 2001, Aku underwent surgery to remove his kidney cancer. He continued to work while undergoing chemotherapy until he died of ureteral cancer on August 1, 2007.

Awarded Songs

References

External links
 

1937 births
2007 deaths
Writers from Hyōgo Prefecture
Japanese lyricists
20th-century Japanese novelists
21st-century Japanese novelists
20th-century Japanese musicians
Recipients of the Medal with Purple Ribbon